PH domain and leucine rich repeat protein phosphatase-like, also known as PHLPPL, is an enzyme which in humans is encoded by the PHLPPL gene.

See also 
 PHLPP

References

Further reading